Willian Lima (born 31 January 2000) is a Brazilian judoka.

He is the gold medallist of the 2021 Pan American Judo Championships in the –66 kg category.

References

External links
 

2000 births
Living people
Brazilian male judoka
21st-century Brazilian people